Calaceite or Calaceit is a municipality located in the Matarraña comarca, in the province of Teruel, Aragon, Spain. According to the 2004 census (INE), the municipality has a population of 1,145 inhabitants.

There are many ancient buildings of great architectural value in the town, as well as the ruins of an ancient Iberian village at Sant Antoni. This town is part of the Catalan-speaking area of Aragon.

Demographics 
Calaceite has 1,132 inhabitants (INE 2008).

Gastronomy
The flaonets de Calaceit (flaonets) are small flaons made in Calaceite. They are small pastries filled with pumpkin jam and honey. The flaonets were one of the traditional pastries fondly remembered by painter Salvador Dalí.

Gallery

References

External links

Town hall of Calaceite
 Website about Calaceite

Municipalities in the Province of Teruel
Matarraña/Matarranya